Total Control is the fourth album by the American West Coast hip hop artist, Yo-Yo. The album was released on October 29, 1996, on East West America and Elektra Records. The album featured production credits from Yo-Yo, DJ Battlecat, DJ U-Neek, and Warren G.

Unfortunately, the album did not achieve wide commercial success, as it only reached number 46 on the Top R&B/Hip-Hop Albums chart. Only one single, "Bonnie and Clyde II" charted. The single was a duet with Ice Cube and it reached number 37 Hot R&B/Hip-Hop Singles & Tracks chart.

Track listing
"One for the Cuties" (feat. MC Lyte)
"Yo-Yo Funk"    
"Bonnie and Clyde II" (feat. Ice Cube)   
"Steady Risin'"    
"Same-Ol' Thang (Every Day)"    
"Tré Ride" (feat. MC Breed)   
"Body Work" (feat. Teena Marie)   
"How Can I be Down" (feat. Ruff Dogg)
"Thank You, Boo"   
"Yo-Yo's Night"

Charts

References

Yo-Yo (rapper) albums
1996 albums
Albums produced by Battlecat (producer)
Albums produced by Warren G
East West Records albums
West Coast hip hop albums